SM U-59 was one of the 329 submarines serving in the Imperial German Navy in World War I. U-59 was engaged in the naval warfare and took part in the First Battle of the Atlantic. She struck a German mine and broke into two parts at Horns Reef at about midnight on 14 May 1917. She lost 33 of her crew; there were 4 survivors. The wreck of U-59 was located in 2002.

The SM U-59 deck gun is on display at the Strandingsmuseum St. George Thorsminde.

Summary of raiding history

References

Notes

Citations

Bibliography

External links
 JD-Contractor presentation of diving expedition to the submarine U59 in 2002

World War I submarines of Germany
1916 ships
U-boats commissioned in 1916
Maritime incidents in 1917
U-boats sunk in 1917
Ships built in Bremen (state)
Type U 57 submarines